The Nagpur–Bhusawal section (railway track) is part of the Howrah–Nagpur–Mumbai line (alternatively known as Mumbai–Kolkata line / Bombay–Calcutta line) and connects Nagpur and Bhusawal both in the Indian state of Maharashtra. This section also has a number of branch lines. Part of one of the major trunk lines in the country, Nagpur–Bhusawal section passes through a section of the Deccan Plateau. The main line crosses Nagpur, Wardha, Amravati, Akola, and Buldhana districts of Vidarbha region and Jalgaon district of Khandesh region.

History

The Great Indian Peninsula Railway extended  the line from Bhusawal to Nagpur in 1867.

The -long,  gauge Achalpur–Murtajapur–Yavatmal line, known as the Shakuntala Railway was built by a British firm, Killik Nixon & Company, in 1903, to carry cotton from the interior of Vidarbha to the Howrah–Nagpur–Mumbai line at Murtajapur. The line, run by the Central Provinces Railways Company, India's only operational private railway company listed on the Bombay Stock Exchange, The line is under conversion to  broad gauge.

The -long,  narrow-gauge railway was built from Pulgaon to Arvi by Central Provinces Railway in 1917. This line is also under conversion to  broad gauge.

The -long,  Butibori–Umrer branch line linking Umrer Coalfield to the main line was established in 1965. The newly laid  Narkhed–Amravati branch line was opened in 2012.

There was a -long -wide metre-gauge line from Jaipur to Secunderabad via Akola.  Most of the part of this line has been converted to  broad gauge. The Great Indian Peninsula Railway was taken over by the state in 1925. In 1951, the Great Indian Peninsula Railway, the Nizam's Guaranteed State Railway, the Scindia State Railways  and the Dholpur Railways were merged to form Central Railway.

The entire main line is electrified. Electrification of the railways in the region started in 1968–69 and continued up to Nandura in 1988–89. The Nandura-Badnera sector was electrified in 1989–90. The Badnera–Wardha sector was electrified in 1990–91. Badnera–Amaravati sector was electrified in 1993–94, Jalamb–Khamgaon and Butibori–Umrer in 1994–95.

In 1910, the District Gazetteer of Buldhana gave an account of the railway line and its importance from the point of view of trade:

Loco sheds

There are electric locomotive sheds at Ajni and Bhusawal on this line and a narrow gauge diesel loco shed at Murtazapur. Ajni loco shed has WAG-7, WAG-9 and WAG-9I locos. Bhusawal loco shed has WAM-4, WAP-4, WAG-5, WAG-7 and WCM-6 locos.

Workshops
Central Railway has three workshops on this line. Nagpur has a workshop for upkeep of passenger coaches and Ajni has facilities for repair of goods wagons. Bhusawal has a workshop for repairs of locos and wagons.

Economy
This line passes through the cotton producing areas of Vidarbha. Mahagenco has two major power stations on this route – the 500MW  Paras Thermal Power Station and the 920 MW Bhusawal Thermal Power Station. Reliance Power has a 600 mW thermal power station at Butibori.

Coal-based thermal power stations consume large quantities of coal. For example, the Bhusawal Thermal Power Station consumed 2,400,000 tonnes of coal in 2006–07, and the Paras Thermal Power Station consumed 351,000 tonnes of coal in the same year. Around 80 per cent of the domestic coal supplies in India are meant for coal based thermal power plants and coal transportation forms 42 per cent of the total freight earnings of Indian railways. There are over 200 coal loading points across India. Coal is transported by rail to around 60 thermal power stations, 12 steel plants and 55 cement factories forming the major customers of coal.

Speed and passenger movement

Nagpur, Akola and Bhusawal, on this line, are amongst the top hundred booking stations of Indian Railway.

References

External links
 Trains at Nagpur
 Trains at Akola
 Trains at Bhusawal

5 ft 6 in gauge railways in India
Rail transport in Maharashtra

Railway lines opened in 1867
Transport in Bhusawal
Transport in Nagpur